The Men's Parallel in the 2022 FIS Alpine Skiing World Cup involved only 1 event, a parallel giant slalom, due to the COVID-19 pandemic. The sole event was won by Christian Hirschbühl of Austria, who thus won the season championship. However, because there was only one race, Hirschbühl did not win a crystal globe symbolizing his championship. This specific championship includes both parallel giant slalom and parallel slalom races. At this time, individual parallel races are not included in the season finals.

The season was interrupted by the 2022 Winter Olympics in Beijing, China (at the Yanqing National Alpine Skiing Centre in Yanqing District) from 6–20 February 2022.  The only parallel competition was a mixed team competition (2 men and 2 women per country), which was held on 20 February 2022.

Standings

DNS = Did Not Start
DNQ = Did Not Qualify

See also
 2022 Alpine Skiing World Cup – Men's summary rankings
 2022 Alpine Skiing World Cup – Men's Overall
 2022 Alpine Skiing World Cup – Men's Downhill
 2022 Alpine Skiing World Cup – Men's Super-G
 2022 Alpine Skiing World Cup – Men's Giant Slalom
 2022 Alpine Skiing World Cup – Men's Slalom
 World Cup scoring system

References

External links
 Alpine Skiing at FIS website

Men's parallel
FIS Alpine Ski World Cup men's parallel discipline titles